The Battle of Beni Mered took place in April 1842 between the French forces and the Algerian resistance from southern Algiers (Boufarik to Beni Mered in Blida Province). The French had established a military reserve camp around the town of Beni Mered between Blida and Boufarik.

The Berber horsemen under Ahmed bin Salem extended their operations from the region of Kabylia to the Mitidja Plain in early 1842 by attacking the French forces around the area of Béni Mered.The attack took place on April 11, 1842, not far from the French military reserve camp, against a detachment of 22 French soldiers under the command of Sergent Blandan. About 300 Berber horsemen under Ahmed bin Salem attacked and annihilated the French detachment.

References 

Battles involving France
Battles involving Algeria
French Algeria
1842 in Algeria
Conflicts in 1842
19th century in Africa
Battles involving the French Foreign Legion
April 1842 events